Areceae is a palm tree tribe in the family Arecaceae.

Subtribes:
Archontophoenicinae
Arecinae
Basseliniinae
Carpoxylinae
Clinospermatinae
Dypsidinae
Linospadicinae
Oncospermatinae
Ptychospermatinae
Rhopalostylidinae
Verschaffeltiinae

Genera not assigned to subtribes:
Bentinckia
Clinostigma
Cyrtostachys
Dictyosperma
Dransfieldia
Heterospathe
Hydriastele
Iguanura
Loxococcus
Rhopaloblaste

See also 
 List of Arecaceae genera

References

External links 

 
Monocot tribes